Chris Gilbert Ward (born May 18, 1949) is a former Major League Baseball player. He batted and threw left-handed.

He was drafted by the Cubs in the 3rd round of the 1968 amateur draft.

External links

1949 births
Living people
Major League Baseball outfielders
Chabot Gladiators baseball players
Chicago Cubs players
Baseball players from California
Hawaii Islanders players